"El puente roto" is a ranchera song by Mexican recording artist Irma Serrano, from her sixth studio album, Mexican Fire (1966). The most popular interpretation is that of Irma Serrano, for which she won a Candelario Azteca de Oro Award.

Charts

References

External links

1966 songs
Irma Serrano songs
Spanish-language songs